PncA is a gene encoding pyrazinamidase in Mycobacterium species. Pyrazinamidase converts the drug pyrazinamide to the active form pyrazinoic acid. There is a strong correlation between mutations in pncA and resistance of M. tuberculosis to pyrazinamide.

See also 
 Pyrazinamide

References 

Enzymes
Prokaryote genes
Tuberculosis